Little Chicken Hollow is a valley in San Mateo County, California.  It contains a stream which is a fork of Honsinger Creek.

References

See also
Big Chicken Hollow
List of watercourses in the San Francisco Bay Area

Valleys of San Mateo County, California
Landforms of the San Francisco Bay Area
Valleys of California
Tributaries of Pescadero Creek